John D. Wagner is an American writer, entrepreneur and investment banker. He is the author of over 20 books and several articles for magazines and newspapers, particularly specializing in the areas of lumber and building materials (LBM), software and corporate finance. Wagner's work has appeared in outlets like The New York Times, National Public Radio (NPR), the Los Angeles Times, and the Chicago Tribune, as well as trade publications including the LBM Journal, the Journal of Light Construction, and Fine Woodworking, among several others. In addition to industry-related content, he also written memoirs, a novel and two poetry books. Wagner has worked as a higher education professor at the University of Alabama, the Community College of Vermont, Burlington College, Saint Michael's College, Mississippi State University and Norwich University. He is also the chief marketing officer of Wagner Media, a marketing agency for companies in the building industry, and the managing director of 1stWest M&A, an investment bank and mergers and acquisitions (M&A) company.

Life and career
Wagner is graduate from the University of Alabama (MFA) and Saint Michael's College (BA). He has worked as a professor at both, as well as in the Community College of Vermont, Burlington College, Mississippi State University and Norwich University. Specializing in the construction industry and the areas of lumber and building materials (LBM), Wagner has written for several trade publications like the LBM Journal, the Journal of Light Construction, Fine Woodworking, Builder, Old-House Journal, and Popular Science, among several others. He has also authored articles for The New York Times, the Los Angeles Times, and the Chicago Tribune, among others.

Wagner has written over 20 books, mostly focusing in the building industry, software and corporate finance. He has also written poetry, memoirs and fiction. His debut middle grade fiction novel, The Crash Crystal: A Lego Mystery, was published in 2011. His poems have been published in journals including Quarterly West, Onion River Review, Jabberwock Review The Independent and The Columbia Review. His first poetry book was Fake Cities, published in 2016 by Ex Ophidia Press. It was followed by The Kallima Butterfly, published in late 2021 by Plain Wrapper Press. In 2020, Wagner was featured in All Things Considered—the flagship news program of the National Public Radio (NPR)—where he read a memoir.

Since 2011, Wagner serves as the chief marketing officer at Wagner Media, a marketing agency for companies in the building products sectors, with a special focus on structural engineering. Since 2015, he is also the managing director of the LBM sector for 1stWest M&A, an investment bank and mergers and acquisitions (M&A) company.

Bibliography

Authored books

As editor, rewrite editor or contributing editor

Chapter contributions

References

External links
 Official website

Living people
20th-century American writers
21st-century American writers
20th-century American businesspeople
21st-century American businesspeople
American investment bankers
Saint Michael's College alumni
Saint Michael's College faculty
University of Alabama alumni
University of Alabama faculty
Year of birth missing (living people)